Saint Honorat or Saint-Honorat may refer to

 Saint Honoratus, Archbishop of Arles
 Île Saint-Honorat, the second largest of the Lérins Islands, in France
 Lérins Abbey, also called St Honorat of Lerins
 List of Empire ships (F)#Empire Ford, a 325 GRT coaster renamed Saint Honorat